is a Japanese manga artist. He attended college at the Osaka University of Arts in the fine arts department. While in college in February 1982, he debuted in the spring special issue of Shōnen Sunday with Hissatsu no Tenkōsei. At this point he dropped out of college and devoted his energies to becoming a manga artist.

Shimamoto is responsible for several long-running and well-known manga series. He drew Honō no Tenkōsei from 1983 to 1985, as well as the Moeyo Pen saga, which began as a 1 volume comic published in 1990 but was continued in two more series totaling 24 volumes. He also worked with Shotaro Ishinomori on a Skull Man manga based on Ishinomori's originally intended storyline, which was licensed in the US by Tokyopop. His baseball manga Gyakkyou Nine was adapted into a live-action Japanese film in 2005.

His past assistants include Katsu Aki, Masaaki Fujihara, Eisaku Kubonouchi and Tetsuo Sanjou. Some of his college classmates include Gainax founders Hideaki Anno and Hiroyuki Yamaga, among others. They later appeared as characters in his manga Aoi Honoo.

Works 
 
  (written by Tetsu Kariya)
 
 
 
 
 
 
 
 
 
 
 
 
 
 
 
 
 
 
 
 
 
 
 
 
 
 
 
 
 
 
  (based on the original Shotaro Ishinomori manga)
  (collaboration with Shotaro Ishinomori)

Character Designs 
  (Title Design)
  (Go Sasakibara)
 
 
  (Hayato Nekketsu)
  (Near Future setting design)
  (character design and scenario supervision)

References

External links
 
 PRISMS - Kazuhiko Shimamoto

 
1961 births
Living people
Osaka University of Arts alumni
Manga artists from Hokkaido
People from Obihiro, Hokkaido